P114 may refer to:

 , a patrol boat of the Mexican Navy
 Papyrus 114, a biblical manuscript
 , a patrol boat of the Turkish Navy
 P114, a state regional road in Latvia